Bobak is a given name and a surname. 

Bobak may also refer to:
Bobak (Slavic demon)
Bobak marmot

See also
 
Babak (disambiguation)